Catastroika may refer to:

 A term coined by Alexander Zinovyev, being contraction of catastrophe and Perestroika
 A film directed by Aris Chatzistefanou and Katerina Kitidi